Vyaz is the name of several rural localities in Russia:
Vyaz, Kirov Oblast, a selo in Pasegovsky Rural Okrug of Kirovo-Chepetsky District of Kirov Oblast
Vyaz, Leningrad Oblast, a village in Tolmachyovskoye Settlement Municipal Formation in Luzhsky District of Leningrad Oblast
Vyaz, Nizhny Novgorod Oblast, a settlement in Ostankinsky Selsoviet of the town of oblast significance of Bor, Nizhny Novgorod Oblast
Vyaz, Pskov Oblast, a village in Novosokolnichesky District of Pskov Oblast